The 2006–07 Liga I was the eighty-ninth season of Liga I, the top-level football league of Romania. Season began on 28 July 2006 and ended on 23 May 2007.

Teams
Eighteen teams played in the 2006–07 season. Four teams were from Moldova, four clubs from Transylvania, one from Dobruja and nine from Wallachia four of them coming from the country's capital city Bucharest.

Pandurii Târgu Jiu had been relegated at the end of the previous season but they re-entered Liga I at the expense of Sportul Studenţesc which has been relegated to Liga II due to financial problems. They relegated together with FC Bacău, who finished 16th last season. The other four new teams which gained access to Liga I were Ceahlăul Piatra Neamţ and Universitatea Craiova (both winning two of the three series of Liga II), plus Unirea Urziceni (winning the playoff for Liga I) and UTA Arad which bought the place from Liberty Salonta (winner of the third series of Liga II).

Venues

Personnel and kits

League table

Positions by round

Results

Top goalscorers

Champion squad

References

Liga I seasons
Romania
1